Mrs. Fang is a 2017 documentary film directed by Wang Bing. It chronicles the last 10 days of the life of Fang Xiuying, a bedridden 68-year-old woman who suffers from advanced Alzheimer's disease. It won Golden Leopard at the 2017 Locarno Festival.

References

External links
 

Chinese documentary films
2017 films
2010s Mandarin-language films
2017 documentary films
Films directed by Wang Bing